The following is a partial list of the "G" codes for Medical Subject Headings (MeSH), as defined by the United States National Library of Medicine (NLM).

This list continues the information at List of MeSH codes (F04). Codes following these are found at List of MeSH codes (G02). For other MeSH codes, see List of MeSH codes.

The source for this content is the set of 2006 MeSH Trees from the NLM.

– biological sciences

– anatomy
  – anatomy, artistic
  – anatomy, comparative
  – anatomy, cross-sectional
  – visible human project
  – anatomy, regional
  – anatomy, veterinary
  – cytology
  – embryology
  – teratology
  – histology
  – histology, comparative
  – neuroanatomy

– biochemistry
  – histocytochemistry
  – immunohistochemistry
  – immunochemistry
  – immunohistochemistry
  – neurochemistry
  – proteomics

– biology
  – botany
  – ethnobotany
  – pharmacognosy
  – computational biology
  – systems biology
  – developmental biology
  – embryology
  – teratology
  – ecology
  – exobiology
  – genetics
  – cytogenetics
  – genetic research
  – human genome project
  – genetics, behavioral
  – genetic determinism
  – genetics, medical
  – eugenics
  – genetic services
  – genetic counseling
  – genetic screening
  – genetics, microbial
  – genetics, population
  – genomics
  – proteomics
  – immunogenetics
  – molecular biology
  – epidemiology, molecular
  – pharmacogenetics
  – toxicogenetics
  – radiation genetics
  – laboratory animal science
  – marine biology
  – microbiology
  – bacteriology
  – environmental microbiology
  – air microbiology
  – food microbiology
  – soil microbiology
  – water microbiology
  – genetics, microbial
  – industrial microbiology
  – mycology
  – virology
  – molecular biology
  – epidemiology, molecular
  – natural history
  – neurobiology
  – parasitology
  – food parasitology
  – parasitic sensitivity tests
  – photobiology
  – radiobiology
  – sociobiology
  – zoology
  – entomology

– biophysics
  – bionics
  – electrophysiology
  – hemorheology

– biotechnology
  – biomimetics

– neurosciences
  – neuroanatomy
  – neurobiology
  – neurochemistry
  – neuroendocrinology
  – neuropharmacology
  – neurophysiology

– pharmacology
  – ethnopharmacology
  – neuropharmacology
  – pharmacoepidemiology
  – pharmacogenetics
  – toxicogenetics
  – pharmacognosy
  – pharmacology, clinical
  – psychopharmacology
  – toxicology
  – toxicogenetics

– physiology
  – electrophysiology
  – endocrinology
  – neuroendocrinology
  – neurophysiology
  – physiology, comparative
  – psychophysiology
  – neuropsychology
  – psychoneuroimmunology

The list continues at List of MeSH codes (G02).

G01